This is a partial list of football stadiums in Honduras, ranked in descending order of capacity.

Existing stadiums

All stadiums except Estadio Yankel Rosenthal are owned by the municipality.

See also
 List of association football stadiums by capacity

References
 World Stadiums

External links

Honduras
Stadiums
Football stadiums